Carn Eige is a mountain in the Northwest Highlands of Scotland. Carn Eige lies between Glen Affric and Loch Mullardoch, and is at the heart of a massif along with its twin peak, the  Mam Sodhail. 

Administratively, it is in the Highland council area, on the boundary between the historic counties of Inverness and Ross and Cromarty, on the former lands of the Clan Chisholm. The mountain is difficult to access, being  from the nearest road, and its sub-peak to the north, Beinn Fhionnlaidh, is even more inaccessible.

Name
The name "Carn Eige", also spelt "Carn Eighe", comes from Scottish Gaelic and has been interpreted as meaning "file peak" or "notch hill". However, according to Ainmean-Àite na h-Alba, the original and correct Gaelic name is Càrn Èite.

Landscape

The summit is pyramid-shaped, the culmination of three ridges meeting. As well as the five Munros topping the massif, there are a further ten minor summits, known as "Munro Tops".

This ridge lies roughly midway between two lochs, Loch Affric/Loch Beinn a' Mheadhoin to the south, and the larger Loch Mullardoch to the north. To the north of the summit, there is an impressive glacial corrie that falls half a kilometre to the shores of Corrie Lochan.

Càrn Eige lies in the north-west highlands, north of the Great Glen Fault. Discontinuous sheets of West Highland granite gneiss stretch up from this fault through Glen Affric.

Summit panorama

History
In 1848, the mountain was climbed by Colonel Winzer of the Ordnance Survey, who discovered a pile of stones and deduced that it had been climbed earlier, although a local gamekeeper suggested it was a shelter (bothy) for watchers. In 1891 Sir Hugh Munro, 4th Baronet listed Càrn Eige in his Munro Tables, in which it has remained. The full set of Munros has been "completed" at least 5,000 times since then.

Flora and fauna
Typical of the Scottish Highlands, the slopes of the mountain are largely treeless, especially at higher altitudes. The mountain is instead clad in a variety of grasses and mosses, which towards the summit are covered by snow during parts of the year. The lower slopes are described by Muir as "boggy, sodden moorland". The base of the southern side of the mountain, adjacent to Loch Affric, is wooded with Scots pine interspersed with other species such as oak, birch, and beech. These woods are inhabited by a number of endemic fauna, including the crested tit and the Scottish crossbill.

Location
Situated in the north of Scotland, Càrn Eige is on the border of two historic counties, Inverness and Ross and Cromarty, and is the highest point of the latter. The summit is at UK grid reference NH123261, which falls on the OS Landranger 25 map, the OS Explorer series 414–5, and the much larger area map 9.

Climbing
The mountain can be climbed from the south, beginning at Loch Affric, up the north side of Gleann nam Fiadh (fording a stream) and reaching the summit of both Càrn Eige itself and then Mam Sodhail in either clockwise or anticlockwise fashion (route described anticlockwise), potentially including Beinn Fhionnlaidh as an extra, since this is relatively difficult to access in any other way. The summit is marked by an Ordnance Survey triangulation pillar (trig point) and a cairn. Including only the three principal Munros (i.e. excluding the two summits to the east), a successful ascent of this mountain might take between 9 and 10 hours. There is also a route to the summit from the north, via Beinn Fhionnlaidh, starting from a boat-accessible spot on Loch Mullardoch.

See also
 List of Munro mountains
 Mountains and hills of Scotland

References

Footnotes

Bibliography

External links

 Càrn Eige is at coordinates 
 Computer-generated virtual panoramas Càrn EigeIndex
 Càrn Eighe on Scottish Sport
 Càrn Eighe on Munro Magic

Ross and Cromarty
Marilyns of Scotland
Munros
Mountains and hills of the Northwest Highlands
Highest points of historic Scottish counties
One-thousanders of Scotland